Pope John X of Alexandria (Abba Yoannis X) was the 85th Pope of Alexandria and Patriarch of the See of St. Mark.

John was known by El-Mo'ataman the Syrian, and he was from Damascus, Syria. He was a righteous and knowledgeable man. He was enthroned on the 12th of Pashons in the Coptic calendar (May 7, 1363 AD). He remained on the throne for six years, two months, and seven days. He was buried at Saint Mercurius Church in Coptic Cairo beside Simon the Tanner.

References 

Atiya, Aziz S. The Coptic Encyclopedia. New York: Macmillan Publishing Co., 1991.

External links 
 The Official website of the Coptic Orthodox Pope of Alexandria and Patriarch of All Africa on the Holy See of Saint Mark the Apostle
Coptic-Syriac Relations beyond Dogmatic Rhetoric
Coptic Popes of Egypt - St-Takla.org
 Coptic Documents in French

14th-century Coptic Orthodox popes of Alexandria
1369 deaths